The 1945 Turkish Football Championship was the 11th edition of the competition. It was held in May. Harp Okulu won their third national championship title by winning the Final Group in Ankara.

The champions of the three major regional leagues (Istanbul, Ankara, and İzmir) qualified directly for the Final Group. İzmit Harp Filosu qualified by winning the qualification play-off, which was contested by the winners of the regional qualification groups.

Qualification play-off

Round 1

Final

Final group

References

External links
RSSSF

Turkish Football Championship seasons
Turkish
Turkey